Short track speed skating at the European Youth Olympic Winter Festival is held at the Erzurum Ice Skating Arena in Erzurum, Turkey from 15 to 17 February 2017.

Medal table

Results

Boys events

Ladies events

Mixed events

References

External links
Results Book – Short Track Speed Skating

2017 in short track speed skating
2017 European Youth Olympic Winter Festival events
2017
Speed skating in Turkey